Industrias AlEn is a Mexican chemical products company with headquarters in Monterrey. Industrias AlEn manufactures household cleaning products under name brands such as Cloralen, Pinol, Pinalen, Flash, Ensueño, among others . Currently, the sales office for the US and Caribbean markets is located in Houston.

Clorox brought a trademark-infringement case against Industrias AlEn before the U.S. International Trade Commission in 2013, alleging that AlEn's Cloralex and Pinol products closely mimicked the Clorox and Pine-Sol brands. AlEn subsequently counter-sued, alleging breach of contract of a 1995 "coexistence" agreement that allowed AlEn to sell its products in the U.S. on the condition of not using certain styles in its packaging that might infringe on Clorox's designs.

References

External links
 
 Cloralex
 Pinol
 Ensueño

Chemical companies of Mexico
Manufacturing companies based in Monterrey